David Nicholas O'Doherty (born 18 December 1975) is an Irish comedian, author, musician, actor and playwright and son of renowned jazz pianist Jim Doherty. His stand-up has won many international awards including the if.comedy award in 2008 and Best International Comedian at the 2014 Sydney Comedy Festival.

He attended Trinity College Dublin, where his comedy career began. "I spent a lot of my time introducing things", he says, "concerts and bands, that sort of thing". "I remember my brother once bet me I couldn't get the word 'spaghetti' into an introduction for a piano recital in the Edmund Burke so I stood-up and said 'my brother has bet me I can't say the word spaghetti' and I got a laugh."

O'Doherty has written several books, written two plays and released three comedy CDs. His latest book for children, Danger Is Everywhere, illustrated by Chris Judge has been selected for the UNESCO Dublin, City of Literature Citywide Reading Campaign. In 2015 it was published in 10 languages around the world.

He regards himself as "a failed jazz musician, scrambling about for something else to do with his life".

Early life
O'Doherty's father is pianist Jim O'Doherty. His grandfather was Kevin O'Doherty, an Irish hurdles champion, and his great-grandfather was Seamus O'Doherty, a head of the Irish Republican Brotherhood. He is the youngest of three children and has an older brother and sister who are seven and eight years older than him, respectively.

He studied philosophy at Trinity College Dublin, where he was a member of the Jazz Society and a fake Breakdancing Society.

Comedic career
O'Doherty worked in a bicycle shop and in telemarketing and temping before he made his first stage appearance at Dublin's Comedy Cellar in 1998. His first full show was The Story of the Boy Who Saved Comedy which received a nomination for Perrier Best Newcomer when it was performed at Edinburgh Fringe. In 2006, he was nominated for an if.comedy award for his Edinburgh show, David O'Doherty Is My Name. O'Doherty has performed at festivals across the world in locations that include Adelaide, Melbourne, Montreal, New York City and Wellington NZ, Moscow and Iceland. As a support act he first toured Ireland with Tommy Tiernan, the United Kingdom with Rich Hall and the United States with Demetri Martin. he has since returned to those places with his own tours. He has often worked with Flight of the Conchords.

in 2006 and 2008 he performed as part of the Honourable Men of Art at the Edinburgh Fringe, along with Daniel Kitson, John Oliver, Andy Zaltzman and Alun Cochrane.

In August 2008, O'Doherty won the If.comedy award at the Edinburgh Fringe for his show Let's Comedy, which featured "a relationship in text messages, tunes played on a 3ft electronic keyboard, and a badger attack". He was presented with the 2008 Intelligent Finance Comedy Award and a cheque for £8,000 (€10,000) by the previous winner Brendon Burns and the Australian author and television presenter Clive James.

He has returned to the Edinburgh Fringe every year since with a new show, that he has toured around the world for much of the following year.

His first CD Giggle Me Timbers (Jokes Ahoy) was recorded at his bedsit flat in front of 35 people. O'Doherty's second CD release called Let's David O'Doherty was recorded at Whelan's in Dublin and released in December 2009. His third CD We Are Not The Champions was recorded in the same venue and was released in 2012.

Edinburgh Fringe shows

Awards and nominations for stand-up comedy
O'Doherty has been decorated with numerous awards for his achievements in comedy. In 1999, he won the Channel 4 So You Think You're Funny Comedy Competition at the Edinburgh Fringe and was also a finalist in the BBC New Comedy Awards in the same year. He has received the accolade of Hot Press Irish Comedian of the Year in 2003 and 2010.  In 2000, he was nominated for Perrier Best Newcomer Award for his show, David O'Doherty: The Boy Who Saved Comedy  followed in 2006 by a nomination for The if.comeddie award for his show, David O'Doherty is My Name  He eventually won the if.comedy Award (formerly the Perrier Award) in 2008 for Let's Comedy.

In 2009 O'Doherty was made honorary president of The Monumental Brass Society, after a particularly well received routine on brass rubbing at the previous year's Edinburgh Fringe. St. Patrick's Cathedral, Dublin, is his favourite place for brass rubbing. He was also nominated for the Barry Award at the Melbourne International Comedy Festival in 2006 and in 2014 received the award for Best International Comedian at the Sydney Comedy Festival.

|-
| 1999 || Edinburgh Fringe || Channel 4 So You Think You're Funny Comedy Competition winner || 
|-
| 1999 ||  || BBC New Comedy Awards || 
|-
| 2000 ||  || Perrier Best Newcomer Award || 
|-
| 2003 ||  || Hot Press Irish Comedian of the Year || 
|-
| 2006 || David O'Doherty is My Name || If.comedy award || 
|-
| 2006 || David O'Doherty is My Name || Barry Award at the Melbourne International Comedy Festival || 
|-
| 2008 || Let's Comedy || If.comedy award || 
|-
| 2014 || David O’Doherty Will Try To Fix Everything || Best International Comedian Sydney Comedy Festival Awards ||

Style 
O'Doherty combines his comedic performance with tunes played on his miniature electronic keyboard. He describes his style of comedy in his song "FAQ for the DOD" as "very low energy musical whimsy" – or "VLEMWy", for short.

Television career 
O'Doherty appears regularly on BBC and Channel 4 TV shows including QI, 8 Out of 10 Cats, Never Mind the Buzzcocks and Would I Lie to You?.

In June 2012 he became the first Irish comedian to have their own Comedy Central Presents episode on American television.

In May 2007, O'Doherty's first TV series, The Modest Adventures of David O'Doherty, began airing on RTÉ Two. The six-part series was directed by John Carney, following the completion of his Academy Award-winning film Once. The premise of each episode was to have the comedian attempt to achieve a goal which he set for himself. The show features O'Doherty, his neighbour Bryan, and his friend Maeve Higgins. A running gag in the show is a reference to road racing cyclist Stephen Roche.

Radio appearances
O'Doherty appeared on The Jon Richardson Show on BBC 6 Music on 23 November 2008 and on 8 November 2009.

He is a regular panelist on David Mitchell's Radio 4 series The Unbelievable Truth.

Literary career
O'Doherty has written widely for newspapers and magazines and also has two plays, two books and a radio series to his name. His debut book was a children's book entitled Ronan Long Gets It Wrong, written in 2001. It was illustrated by David Roberts and published by Mammoth Storybooks. 
His first play is entitled Saddled and was written with Bryan Quinn. It was claimed as "the world's first theatrical production to feature live repair of audience members' bicycles". In 2008, he and fellow Irish comedian Maeve Higgins performed I Can't Sleep, a play recommended for children aged 5–8. This was O'Doherty's first play for children. The play, which involved the audience entering the theatre to find both performers asleep in separate beds, was performed in both Dublin and Edinburgh.

He has also written a series for RTÉ Radio about bee detectives with his brother Mark, entitled The Bees of Manulla. O'Doherty released a book detailing 100 false facts about pandas called 100 Facts About Pandas. He followed this up with 100 Facts About Sharks which is 100 false facts about sharks. In 2014 he and illustrator, Chris Judge, released a children's book, Danger Is Everywhere: A Handbook for Avoiding Danger.

Personal life
O'Doherty is an avid cyclist and owned, as of 2021, 14 bicycles.

Filmography
In 2008, O'Doherty starred alongside comedian Dylan Moran, Keith Allen and Neil Jordan in A Film with Me in It, a cinematic release written by and starring his brother Mark Doherty.

Discography
O'Doherty has also released five live audio albums, Giggle Me Timbers (or Jokes Ahoy!), recorded in front of 35 people in his studio apartment and Let's David O'Doherty (2009), We Are Not The Champions (2012) and You Only Live (2015) recorded at Whelan's in Dublin. Live in His Own Car During A Pandemic was recorded in his car in June 2020.

References

External links

 Official site
 
 Modest Adventures at RTÉ
 RTÉ press release
 

1975 births
Living people
Irish comedy musicians
Irish male comedians
Irish stand-up comedians
Musicians from County Dublin
People educated at St Michael's College, Dublin